The 1974 Atlantic Coast Conference men's basketball tournament was held in Greensboro, North Carolina, at the Greensboro Coliseum from March 7–9. NC State defeated Maryland in overtime, 103–100, to win the championship. Tommy Burleson of NC State was named the tournament MVP. 

The final pitted arguably the two best teams in the country and has long been regarded by many to be the greatest ACC game in history, and one of the greatest college games ever.  The game was instrumental in forcing the expansion of the NCAA Division I men's basketball tournament to 32 teams, thus allowing more than one bid from a conference. That Maryland team, with six future NBA draft picks, is considered, by Bill Free of the Baltimore Sun newspaper, the greatest team that did not participate in the NCAA tournament.  

Many considered it the all-time greatest college basketball game until Duke pulled off a last-second overtime finish in the 1992 NCAA Division I East Regional final for a 104–103 win over Kentucky. "I know they call the Duke–Kentucky game the greatest now," said Burleson in 1999 at a 25-year commemoration of the 1974 game, "but we're still the greatest ACC game ever."

NC State went on to win the 1974 NCAA tournament, dethroning Bill Walton and seven-time defending national champion UCLA in the semifinals in another classic, before defeating Marquette in the final.

Bracket

References

Tournament
ACC men's basketball tournament
Basketball in North Carolina
College sports in North Carolina
Sports competitions in Greensboro, North Carolina
ACC men's basketball tournament
ACC men's basketball tournament